A love song is a song about being in love.

Love Song or Lovesong may also refer to:

Film, TV, and theatre
 The Love Song, a 1925 operetta with lyrics by Harry B. Smith
 "Love Song",  the fourteenth episode of The Motorola Television Hour, a 1953-54 US drama anthology television series
 Love Song (1954 film), an Italian film directed by Giorgio Simonelli
 Love Song (1985), a movie starring Maurice Denham and Constance Cummings
 Love Song (2000 film), an MTV movie starring Monica
 Love Song (2001 film), a Japanese film starring Nakama Yukie
 Lovesong, a 2001 non-narrative short film by Stan Brakhage
 Love Song (play), a 2006 play by John Kolvenbach
 Love Song (TV series), a 2016 Japanese television series
 Lovesong (film), 2016
 A Love Song (film), a 2022 American film

Literature
 Lovesong (novel), a 2009 novel by Alex Miller
 Love Song: The Lives of Kurt Weill and Lotte Lenya, a 2012 dual biography by Ethan Mordden

Music
 Love Song (band), Christian rock band, or their self-titled album

Albums
 Love Song (Anne Murray album), 1974
 Love Song (Gary Bartz album), 1977
 Love Song (Riya album), 2005

Songs
 "Lovesong" (The Cure song), 1989, also covered by 311 in 2004 and Adele in 2011
 "Lovesong" (Amiel song), 2003
 "Love Song" (Lesley Duncan song), from Sing Children Sing (1968), also recorded twice by Elton John and Sharon O'Neill
 "Love Song" (The Damned song), 1979
 "Love Song" (Simple Minds song), 1981
 "Love Song" (The Oak Ridge Boys song), 1983
 "Love Song" (Tesla song), 1989
 "Love Song" (Sky song), 1999
 "Love Song" (Luna Sea song), 2000
 "Love Song" (Blue Café song), 2004
 "Love Song" (M-Flo song), 2006
 "Love Song" (Sara Bareilles song), 2007
 "Love Song" (Big Bang song), by BIGBANG (2011)
 "A Love Song" (Loggins and Messina song), by Kenny Loggins and Jim Messina, 1973, also covered by Anne Murray
 "A Love Song" (Lee Greenwood song), by Lee Greenwood (1982), also covered by Kenny Rogers (1982)
 "The Love Song" (Miroslav Žbirka song) ("V slepých uličkách"), by Miroslav Žbirka (1981)
 "The Love Song" (Jeff Bates song), by Jeff Bates (2002)
 "The Love Song" (k-os song), by k-os (2007)
 "Loveeeeeee Song", by Rihanna, featuring Future, 2012
 "Love Song", by AC/DC from High Voltage, 1975
 "Love Song", by Angus & Julia Stone, 2021
 "Love Song", by Alice in Chains from Sap, 1992
 "Love Song", by Ayumi Hamasaki from Love Songs, 2010
 "Love Song", by the Dandy Warhols from ...Earth to the Dandy Warhols..., 2008
 "Love Song", by Five for Fighting from Message for Albert, 1997
 "Love Song", by John Patrick Amedori from Stick It, 2006
 "Love Song", by Korn from See You on the Other Side, 2005
 "Love Song", by Lana Del Rey, from Norman Fucking Rockwell!, 2019
 "Love Song", by Lucky Twice, 2010
 "Love Song", by Madonna and Prince, from Like a Prayer, 1989
 "Love Song", by Pink from Try This, 2003
 "Love Song", by Rain from his EP Back to the Basic, 2010
 "Love Song", by Syd Barrett from Barrett, 1970
 "Love Song", by Third Day from Third Day, 1996
 "Love Song", by Tilly and the Wall from Bottoms of Barrels, 2006
 "Love Song", by Tommy James, 1972
 "Love Song", by Vixen from Live & Learn, 2006
 "Love Song", by Why Don't We from The Good Times and the Bad Ones, 2021
 "A Love Song", by Amanda Blank from I Love You, 2009
 "The Love Song", by Marilyn Manson from Holy Wood (In the Shadow of the Valley of Death), 2000

Visual arts
 Love Song (Giorgio de Chirico) or The Song of Love, a 1914 painting by Giorgio de Chirico
 The Love Song (Rockwell), a 1926 painting by Norman Rockwell

See also
 Love You Like a Love Song, by Selena Gomez & the Scene, 2011
 Love Songs (disambiguation)
 Love Sign (disambiguation)
 Song of Love (disambiguation)